Saint-Médard-de-Mussidan (literally Saint Médard of Mussidan; Limousin: Sent Meard de Moissídan or Sent Mierd de Moissídan) is a commune in the Dordogne department in Nouvelle-Aquitaine in southwestern France.

Population

See also
Communes of the Dordogne department

References

Communes of Dordogne
Dordogne communes articles needing translation from French Wikipedia